Mees Hendrikx (born 8 August 2000) is a Dutch cyclist, who currently rides for the IKO–Crelan team in cyclo-cross, and UCI Continental team  for his road races.

Career
Hendrikx was a promising junior rider, winning the junior race at the Grand Prix Nommay, part of the 2017–18 UCI Cyclo-cross World Cup where he finished third in the overall classification with four podium finishes in 7 races. After a disappointing, injury-riddled winter season in 2018-2019 he couldn't find a team. As an independent rider, he achieved more success in the next cyclo-cross season, culminating in his selection for the Dutch team for the 2020 UCI Cyclo-cross World Championships in Switzerland, where he won the bronze medal in the U23 category.

In the 2021–2022 season, he won his first U23 World Cup race with the Cyklokros Tábor in the Czech Republic. He also won the overall U23 World Cup, having finished 3rd in the three other races. He finished 9th in the Duinencross Koksijde, an elite World Cup race, and was third in the Dutch cyclocross championships, and first of the U23 riders.

Major results

Cyclo-cross

2017–2018
 3rd Overall UCI Junior World Cup
1st Nommay
2nd Bogense
3rd Hoogerheide
3rd Zeven
 2nd National Junior Championships
 Junior Soudal Classics
2nd Sint-Niklaas
2019–2020
 2nd National Under-23 Championships
 3rd  UCI World Under-23 Championships
2021–2022
 1st  Overall UCI Under-23 World Cup
1st Tábor
3rd Namur
3rd Dendermonde
3rd Flamanville
 Under-23 X²O Badkamers Trophy
2nd Loenhout
2nd Lille
3rd Brussels
 3rd National Championships
 3rd Ardooie

References

External links
Mees Hendrikx at Cyclocross 24

2000 births
Living people
Dutch male cyclists
Cyclo-cross cyclists
People from Valkenswaard
Cyclists from North Brabant
21st-century Dutch people